Max et les ferrailleurs is a 1971 crime drama film directed by Claude Sautet, based on the novel of the same name by Claude Néron. The film stars Michel Piccoli and Romy Schneider, with François Périer and Georges Wilson in supporting roles.

Plot
Born into a wealthy family of French vintners, Max is a loner who devoted himself entirely to his obsession: the arrest of criminals. A former judge he is a police inspector and he sees a new band of burglars escape. This failure is still fresh in his mind when he meets Abel who has become a scrap thief and plunders construction sites with a small band of hoodlums around Nanterre. Max plans to encourage them to commit something big and catch them on the spot. Posing as a client, he meets Lily, a young German-born prostitute who is the companion of Abel. He pretends to be the director of a small bank branch which receives significant amounts of money at regular intervals. He ensures the support of his police commissioner. Max fails however to reveal his role as instigator. Gradually, some feeling arises between Max and Lily. But Max keeps a reserved attitude and merely influences the scrap through her. Finally, guessing the band ready for action, he communicates an ideal date to commit robbery. On the scheduled day, the police await them and they are arrested. Later in the police station, Rosinsky (the top cop in the bank's district) reveals to Max that he wants all collaborators brought to justice, including Lily. Distraught, Max tries to save her and ends up threatening Rosinsky. In an argument, Max pulls out his gun and kills him.

Cast

U.S. release
The film had its belated U.S. theatrical premiere in New York in August 2012.

References

External links
 
 
 

1971 films
1971 crime drama films
Films about prostitution in France
Films based on French novels
Films directed by Claude Sautet
Films scored by Philippe Sarde
Films shot in Paris
Films with screenplays by Jean-Loup Dabadie
French crime drama films
1970s French-language films
French neo-noir films
Italian crime drama films
Italian neo-noir films
Police detective films
1970s French films
1970s Italian films